Lynn Short is a lecturer at the School of Community Health Sciences, University of Nevada, Reno.

Education
Short has a MPH from the Boston University School of Public Health (1995 - Social and Behavioral Sciences) and a BS from Old Dominion University (1984 - Dental Hygiene/Sociology (minor)). She also has an AS from Cape Cod Community College with a major in Dental Hygiene (1983).

Career
Short has had numerous teaching positions but has also worked as Executive Director of Inyo Mono Advocates for Community Action, Director, Office of Oral Health at the Massachusetts Department of Public Health (MDPH), and Program Coordinator, Seal, Educate, Advocate Learning (SEAL): a Boston School-Based Preventive Dental Program.

References

University of Nevada, Reno faculty
Boston University School of Public Health alumni
Old Dominion University alumni
Year of birth missing (living people)
Living people